Stockholm attack may refer to:

 Stockholm Bloodbath, 1520
 2017 Stockholm truck attack
 2010 Stockholm bombings

See also 
 2013 Stockholm riots (disambiguation)
 2016 Sweden terrorism plot
 Terrorism in Sweden
 Stockholm syndrome
 Mats Hinze
 Stockholm hostage crisis (disambiguation)